The March of the Björneborg Regiment (also Finnish Soldiers in the War of 1808 – 1809) is a gouache painting by Finnish painter Albert Edelfelt completed in 1892.

The painting depicts marching Finnish soldiers in a wintry landscape during the Finnish War fought between the Kingdom of Sweden and the Russian Empire from 1808 to 1809. As a result of the war, Finland was separated from the Swedish kingdom and annexed as an autonomous grand duchy of the Russian empire.

The subject of the painting is the poem of the same name included in the second part of J. L. Runeberg's The Tales of Ensign Stål, which was inspired by a piece of music known as Björneborgarnas marsch. Jean Sibelius composed a version of Björneborgarnas marsch for the unveiling of the painting in 1892, but this version was lost.

There are two versions of the painting. The second version hangs at the Ateneum in Helsinki, Finland.

References

External links 

 Serlachius Museums
 Finnish National Gallery

1892 paintings
Paintings by Albert Edelfelt
Paintings in the collection of the Ateneum
Paintings of people